Glaphyromorphus arnhemicus  is a species of skink found in the Northern Territory.

References

Glaphyromorphus
Reptiles described in 1967
Taxa named by Glen Milton Storr